is a Japanese racing driver.

Career

Formula Three
After competing in Formula Dream in 2004, Tsukakoshi moved into the All-Japan Formula Three Championship for the 2005 campaign. Competing for M Tec, Tsukakoshi finished his first season in fourteenth position. He moved to Honda Team Mugen for the 2006 season, finishing fifth in the standings, taking a victory at Suzuka. Another fifth place championship finish followed in 2007, as Tsukakoshi took two wins for Honda Team Real at Okayama and Suzuka. He also finished in second place at the prestigious Macau Grand Prix for Manor Motorsport; finishing behind Oliver Jarvis. Tsukakoshi moved to Manor Motorsport and the Formula Three Euroseries for the 2008 season. He finished seventh in the championship standings, with a best result of second place on four occasions.

Racing record

Complete Super GT results
(key) (Races in bold indicate pole position) (Races in italics indicate fastest lap)

* Season still in progress.

Complete Formula Nippon/Super Formula results
(key) (Races in bold indicate pole position) (Races in italics indicate fastest lap)

References

External links

 Official website
 Career statistics from Driver Database

1986 births
Living people
Sportspeople from Tochigi Prefecture
Japanese racing drivers
Japanese Formula 3 Championship drivers
Super GT drivers
Formula 3 Euro Series drivers
Formula Nippon drivers
Super Formula drivers
Manor Motorsport drivers
20th-century Japanese people
21st-century Japanese people
Dandelion Racing drivers
Prema Powerteam drivers